The 2019 Indian general election held in India on 19 May 2019 to constitute the 17th Lok Sabha.

Candidates 
Major election candidates are:

Results

Assembly segments wise lead of parties

References 

2019 Indian general election
Himachal Pradesh
Indian general elections in Himachal Pradesh
2010s in Himachal Pradesh